The Battle of the Terek River was the last major battle of Tokhtamysh–Timur war. It took place on 14 April 1395, at the Terek River, North Caucasus. The result was a victory for Timur.

Battle
Tokhtamysh's cavalry attacked the right flank and the center of Timur's army. Instead of forcing Timur's army back, some Golden Horde emirs went over to Timur's side. Timur, along with the defected emirs, defeated the left flank of Tokhtamysh's army, forcing his army into a rout. The victorious army of Timur dispersed Tokhtamysh's army.

Afterward
While pursuing Tokhtamysh, Timur annihilated the cities of Astrakhan, Sarai, and Azov.

References

Sources

Terek River
Terek River
Terek River
Terek River
1395 in Europe